Verticordia plumosa var. grandiflora is a shrub up to 1.4 m tall found along the southern coastal regions of Southwest Australia. It is a variety of the species Verticordia plumosa, and is sometimes found growing in association with Verticordia verticordina in heath.

References

External links
 

plumosa var. grandiflora
Rosids of Western Australia